A cat tongue is a small biscuit (cookie) or chocolate bar available in a number of European, Asian, and South American countries. 

They are known locally as "kočičí jazýčky" (Czech), Kattentong (Dutch), "kocie języczki" (Polish), "langue de chat" (French), "Katzenzungen" (German), "lingua di gatto" (Italian), "língua de gato" (Portuguese), "macskanyelv" (Hungarian), "lengua" or "lengua de gato" (Spanish), "limbă de pisică" (Romanian) or "lidah kucing" (Indonesian). They are shaped somewhatlike a cat's tongue (long and flat).

Cookies (biscuits) 
Cat's tongue cookies are sweet and crunchy. The original recipe most likely comes from 17th century France. They are produced from egg white, wheat flour, sugar, butter (sometimes) and vanilla. They are baked in the oven until cooked. Additional ingredients may include chocolate, citrus, and spices. 

In European cuisine they are prepared with a ganache, cream or jam filling, and sandwiched together. They are sometimes dipped in chocolate as part of their preparation. In France, the cookie is often served with sorbet or ice cream. In the Canary Islands, cat's tongue cookies are served with bienmesabe, a dessert dish.

A cat's tongue mold pan may be used in their preparation, in which cookie dough is placed and then baked. In French, this pan is known as langue-de-chat. This pan is also used in the preparation of ladyfingers and éclairs. The mold is also referred to as a cat's tongue plaque.

In Japan, a "langue de chat" is a square sandwich cookie, made of a layer of white chocolate between two square cookies. Shiroi Koibito is one famous manufacturer, but langues de chat can be found throughout Japan, including 白い針葉樹  in Nagano and まごころづつみ in Hiroshima.

Chocolate bars 
They are produced from milk chocolate, dark chocolate and white chocolate.

Chocolate cat tongues have been in production since before 1900; the Austrian company Küfferle (now owned by Lindt & Sprüngli) has been producing them since 1892. Elsewhere in Europe, companies including Sarotti, Hachez and Halloren make cat tongues. In Brazil, they are manufactured by Zermatt and Kopenhagen. In Chile they are made by Costa under the name "Lengüitas de gato" (little cat tongues). Hungarians widely believe that the Swiss-born Hungarian patissier Emil Gerbeaud invented the delicacy in the late 1880s.

See also

 Ladyfingers - biscuits shaped like large fingers
 Kue lidah kucing
 Lengua de gato
 List of cookies
 Milano (cookie)

References

Chocolate confectionery
Cookies
Biscuits